Savané is a surname. Notable people with the surname include:

 Amadou Sy Savané (born 1974), Guinean sprinter
 Landing Savané (born 1945), Senegalese politician
 Marie-Angélique Savané (born 1947), Senegalese sociologist and feminist activist
 Mohamed Sy Savané (born 1968), Guinean middle-distance runner
 Souléymane Sy Savané, Ivorian-American actor